Mounam Kalaikirathu is a 1986 Indian Tamil-language romance film directed by Kundrai Vaendan Karikalan, starring Suresh, Jeevitha, Anand Babu, Jayashree, Vijayakumar, Chinni Jayanth and S. S. Chandran. It was released on 12 December 1986.

Plot 

Rajesh and Deepa are lovers, but Kannan too loves Deepa without knowing of her relationship with Rajesh. Shobana, a doctor, she loves Kannan as well. The film explores these relationships and finally break the ice of silence.

Cast 
Suresh as Kannan
Jeevitha as Deepa
Anand Babu as Rajesh
Jayashree as Shobana
Vijayakumar
Chinni Jayanth
S. S. Chandran
Senthil

Music 
The music was composed by Shankar–Ganesh.

Reception 
Mounam Kalaikirathu was released on 12 December 1986. The Indian Express wrote, "The narration is made in a naturalistic vein and is not boring".

References

External links 
 

1980s Tamil-language films
1986 films
1986 romance films
Films scored by Shankar–Ganesh
Indian romance films